It's Not Us (stylized as it's not us) is the eleventh studio album by progressive rock band Umphrey's McGee. The album was released on January 12, 2018.

Track listing

Personnel 
 Brendan Bayliss – guitar, vocals
 Jake Cinninger – guitar, keyboards, vocals
 Joel Cummins – keyboards, vocals
 Ryan Stasik – bass
 Kris Myers – drums, vocals
 Andy Farag – percussion
 Joshua Redman – featured on track 9

References

External links
 Album website

Umphrey's McGee albums
2018 albums